The 1918–19 Iowa State Cyclones men's basketball team (also known informally as Ames) represented Iowa State University during the 1918-19 NCAA College men's basketball season. The Cyclones were coached by Harter Walter, who was in his fourth and final season with the Cyclones. They played their home games at the State Gymnasium in Ames, Iowa. They defeated the 219th Signal Battalion of Camp Dodge on December 28, 1918, in a "practice game" by the score of 19 to 7. They were originally scheduled to host Coe on January 2, 1919, but it was postponed due to the influenza pandemic. Iowa State was originally scheduled to play Nebraska, but could not come to an agreement, claiming the Nebraska gymnasium was too small.

They finished the season 5–11, 3–8 in Missouri Valley play to finish in sixth place.

Roster

Schedule and results 

|-
!colspan=6 style=""|Exhibition

|-
!colspan=6 style=""|Regular Season

|-

References 

Iowa State Cyclones men's basketball seasons
Iowa State
Iowa State Cyc
Iowa State Cyc